Club Voleibol Pòrtol is a professional volleyball team based in Palma de Mallorca, Spain. It plays in the 1ª Balear de Voleibol after its renounce to play in Superliga just before 2011–12 season.

Trophies
Superliga (3)
Winner : 2006, 2007, 2008
Runner up : 2005
Copa del Rey (2)
Winner : 2005, 2006
Supercopa de España (3)
Winner : 2005, 2007, 2008
CEV Cup
Runner up : 2006
CEV Challenge Cup
Runner up : 2005

Notable former players
 Alexis González
 Stéphane Antiga
 Sébastien Ruette
 Axel Jennewein
 Enrique de la Fuente
 Guillermo Falasca
 Miguel Ángel Falasca
 Julián García Torres
 José Luis Moltó
 Ibán Pérez
 Ernesto Rodríguez
 Iván Márquez
 Luis Díaz

External links
CV Pòrtol official website

Spanish volleyball clubs
Sports teams in the Balearic Islands